Taiping Bridge, may refer to:

 , in Longnan, Jiangxi, China.

 Taiping Bridge (She County), in She County, Anhui, China.

 Taiping Bridge (Shaoxing), in Shaoxing, Zhejiang, China.

 , in An County, Sichuan, China.